Let the Daylight Into the Swamp is a 2012 Canadian short docudrama film, directed by Jeffrey St. Jules. Exploring the breakup of his grandparents Donal and Hélène soon after his father's birth, the film is narrated by Matthew Rankin, and dramatizes the original events as acted by a cast that includes Pierre Simpson and Colombe Demers as his grandparents in their youth, and Sean McCann and Diana Leblanc as his grandparents in older age.

The film premiered at the 2012 Toronto International Film Festival. It was a Canadian Screen Award nominee for Best Short Documentary at the 1st Canadian Screen Awards in 2013, and won the Golden Sheaf Award - Best of Festival and Best Experimental at the Yorkton Film Festival.

References

External links
 
 Watch Let the Daylight Into the Swamp at the National Film Board of Canada

2012 short documentary films
2012 films
Canadian short documentary films
National Film Board of Canada short films
National Film Board of Canada documentaries
Canadian docudrama films
Films directed by Jeffrey St. Jules
Canadian drama short films
2010s Canadian films